

Explorations 
 May - Jean-Frédéric Waldeck begins a year's stay at the Maya ruins of Palenque.

Finds
 15 October - The Hexham Hoard of eight thousand copper-alloy coins (stycas) in a bronze bucket is discovered while a grave is being dug close to Hexham Abbey in the north of England.

Publications
 Ippolito Rosellini, Monumenti dell'Egitto e della Nubia begins publication.

Births
 29 July - Luigi Palma di Cesnola, Italian American soldier, diplomat, archaeologist and museum director (d. 1904)
 1 November - Marianne Brocklehurst, English Egyptological traveller and expedition sponsor (d. 1898)

Deaths

 4 March - Jean-François Champollion, French decipherer of Egyptian hieroglyphs (b. 1790)
 13 May - Georges Cuvier, French naturalist, zoologist and paleontologist (b. 1769)

See also
 List of years in archaeology
 1831 in archaeology
 1833 in archaeology

References

Archaeology
Archaeology by year
Archaeology
Archaeology